Mırtı (also, Myrty) is a village and municipality in the Goychay Rayon of Azerbaijan.  It has a population of 2,340. The municipality consists of the villages of Mırtı and Əlikənd.

References 

Populated places in Goychay District